Boris Murmann is a professor in the Department of Electrical Engineering at Stanford University.

He is co-director and a founding faculty of the Stanford SystemX Alliance. He is the faculty director of Stanford's System Prototyping Facility (SPF).

Murmann's research areas include mixed-signal integrated circuit design, sensor interfaces, data converters and custom circuits for machine learning, and solid-state electronics.

In 2018, Murmann holds more than 5 patents.

Education
Murmann received his Ph.D. in Electrical Engineering from University of California, Berkeley in 2003. A M.S. in Electrical Engineering from Santa Clara University in 1999, “with Distinction”. His bachelor in Communications Engineering, from the Fachhochschule of the German Telekom in 1994. Murmann is originally from Germany.

Work and Academic Career
Murmann joined Stanford University in 2004. From 1994 to 1997, he was with Neutron Microelectronics, Germany, where he developed low-power and smart-power ASICs in automotive CMOS technology. Since 2004, he has worked as a consultant with numerous Silicon Valley companies.

Murmann has participated on several technical advisory boards within Silicon Valley. He participates on several committees for professional groups, such as IEEE, ISSCC, ESSCC, etc.

Awards and honors
 IEEE Fellow, 2015
 Friedrich Wilhelm Bessel Research Award, 2012
 Agilent Early Career Professor Award, 2009

External links
 Google Scholar, Boris Murmann
 Boris Murmann, Stanford University
 Murmann Mixed-Signal Group, All Publications

References 

Fellow Members of the IEEE
Living people
21st-century American engineers
Stanford University School of Engineering faculty
Stanford University Department of Electrical Engineering faculty
Year of birth missing (living people)
American electrical engineers